

History 
Site number 24, which was built with wooden houses around the middle of the 19th century, was owned by the wife of the caster of the Lutheran Church, Sh. F. Meyer. Later, it was owned by the daughter of State Councilor O. N. Kobylskaya (then, by her husband, Vlasyeva). She had the current mansion built on the basement of the former wooden house. The architect is unknown. After the October Revolution, the house was converted into apartments. In the 21st century, an attic was constructed.

Architecture 
The house is a two-story building with a square floor plan. It is made of brick with plaster finish. The main façade (along Church Street) is asymmetrical where the right corner is decorated with a bay window. The style of the house reflects elements of the Northern Art Nouveau. The shapes and sizes of the window openings are diverse. The doorway is decorated with a lancet portal, above which the cornice ends with tongs and an oval window. Among the details of the house décor, there are stucco belts, window frames in the form of Sandvik, stucco gothic ornament, scapula, and traction between floors. Above the entrance was a lancet metal canopy with forged parts which are not preserved. This, along with the metal fence from the side of Church Street were done in the Art Nouveau style.

References

Literature

Sources 
 
 

Buildings and structures in Pushkin
1898 establishments in the Russian Empire
Houses completed in 1898
Cultural heritage monuments in Saint Petersburg